Mame is a 1974 Technicolor musical film in Panavision based on the 1966 Broadway musical of the same name (itself based on the 1958 film Auntie Mame) and the 1955 novel Auntie Mame by Patrick Dennis.

It was directed by Gene Saks, and adapted by Paul Zindel, and starred Lucille Ball in her final theatrical film performance. The cast also stars Beatrice Arthur, Bruce Davison, and Robert Preston.

The story focuses on the madcap life of Mame Dennis (Ball), which is disrupted when she becomes the guardian of her deceased brother's son. She marries a wealthy Southern plantation owner (Preston), is widowed, yet through it all, with the help of her dearest friend, Vera Charles (Arthur), manages to keep things under control.

Plot
At the reading of the will of young Patrick Dennis's father, a trustee, Mr. Babcock, reveals that Patrick is to be left in the care of his aunt, Mame Dennis, and his nanny, Agnes Gooch. Taking a train to New York City ("St. Bridget"), Agnes and the boy arrive at Mame's home, where they walk into a wild party ("It's Today").

Mame wants to fill the child's life with adventure ("Open a New Window"), but when Babcock finds out she has enrolled Patrick in a non-traditional school, Patrick is taken from Mame's custody. Simultaneously, the stock market crash leaves Mame penniless. Mame's friend, actress Vera Charles, offers Mame a small role in her newest show as "The Man in the Moon." Mame flubs her one line and causes the play to be a disaster, which puts a major rift in their friendship. Patrick reassures Mame that he still loves her ("My Best Girl").

A desperate Mame takes a job in a department store, where she meets Beauregard Jackson Pickett Burnside, to whom she attempts to sell a pair of roller skates. She cannot write up a cash order and is fired. At home, Mame decides to lift everyone's spirits by decorating the house for Christmas and giving everyone their gifts early ("We Need a Little Christmas"). Burnside appears at her front door and invites everyone to dinner. They fall in love and move to his family's plantation in Peckerwood, Georgia. At first, Burnside's relatives are unhappy about his marrying a Yankee, but when Mame captures the fox in a fox hunt, they sing her praises ("Mame").

The Burnsides go on an extended honeymoon, traveling all over the world ("Loving You"). Meanwhile, Patrick goes from a young child who pulls in a B+ average to a high school senior failing many classes ("The Letter"). When Burnside dies in an avalanche, Mame returns home to be reunited with a now-grown Patrick, who is dating a snobby, conservative girl named Gloria Upson.

When Mame meets Vera for a drink, the two trade snippy comments, which they insist are not being made out of hatred, but simple honesty, as that's what "Bosom Buddies" do. The two come home and reminisce about men they've dated. Agnes, who is listening to the conversation, admits that she's never had a date. Mame and Vera decide to give the uptight, frumpy Agnes a makeover and send her out to live. Six months later, Agnes returns home, pregnant, and describes what she did while living it up ("Gooch's Song").

Mame visits the Upsons at their home in Connecticut, where she learns that Patrick and Gloria are engaged. After finding the Upsons to be insufferable bores and bigots, Mame is asked to help pay for a piece of property next door so that Patrick and Gloria could live there, as opposed to "the wrong kind of people". Afterward, she is candid with Patrick about her disdain for the family. He admits that he's ashamed of her and her "crazy" friends. A heartbroken Mame wonders what she did wrong with this boy she raised ("If He Walked Into My Life").

Mame and Patrick apologize to each other at her home. They are dressed for company: the Upsons. Mame promises to behave and Patrick meets Mame's new maid, Pegeen. Mr. and Mrs. Upson announce that the property they wanted has been bought by some "Jew lawyer". Mame reveals that she bought the property next door so she could build the Beauregarde Burnside Memorial Home For Single Mothers. This is the final straw, and the Upsons leave, angry that Mame isn't "one of us." Patrick, visibly upset, also leaves.

Years later, following World War II, Patrick and Pegeen are married and have a child, Peter. Mame, who is going on a trip to Siberia, requests that Peter be allowed to go with her. The two get onto a plane, and Patrick states that Mame has not changed. Mame and Peter wave goodbye and go into the plane.

Cast

Musical numbers

 "Main Title Including St. Bridget" - Agnes, Orchestra
 "It's Today" - Mame, Orchestra
 "Open a New Window" - Mame, young Patrick
 "The Man in the Moon" - Vera, Chorus
 "My Best Girl" - Mame, young Patrick
 "We Need a Little Christmas" - Mame, Agnes, Ito, young Patrick
 "Mame" - Beau, Chorus
 "Loving You" - Beau
 "The Letter" - young Patrick, adult Patrick
 "Bosom Buddies" - Mame, Vera
 "Gooch's Song" - Agnes
 "If He Walked Into My Life" - Mame
 "It's Today" (reprise) - Mame
 "Open a New Window" (reprise) - Mame, adult Patrick
 "Finale (Open a New Window/Mame)" - Mame, Chorus

Production
Filming, scheduled to begin in early 1972, was postponed when Ball broke her leg in a skiing accident. Owing to the delay, the original director, George Cukor, was forced to withdraw from the project. The assignment went to Gene Saks, who had helmed the Broadway production.

Production began in January 1973. Bea Arthur reprised her Tony award–winning role of Vera Charles. Ball, who had casting approval, was dissatisfied with Madeline Kahn's interpretation of Gooch and had her replaced by Jane Connell, another member of the original Broadway cast.

Warner Bros. executives passed over Angela Lansbury for the title role, even though she had won the Tony for her performance of the role on Broadway.

Reception

Radio City Music Hall selected the film to be its Easter attraction. The film was a U.S. box-office failure and many reviews, especially those for Ball, were particularly brutal; the movie holds a 33% rating on Rotten Tomatoes based on nine reviews. Gene Siskel of the Chicago Tribune gave the film one-and-a-half stars out of four, calling it "a total bust, devoid of joy, wit, good music, or decent dancing", adding: 

Pulitzer Prize-winning playwright Paul Zindel ["The Effect of the Gamma Rays on the Man-in-the-Moon Marigolds"] is credited with the screenplay for "Mame," and it's a mess. Editing is partially to blame.

There are many awkward transitions that render character motivation absurd. Talking about "Mame" in terms of character motivation gives the enterprise more credit than it deserves. The film is coarse, embarrassing, and tedious in turn. That it has been billed as "wholesome family entertainment" is an insult to each of those words.

Aside from Robert Preston's brief appearance as the wealthy southerner, and an amusing music hall routine that smacks of the fine burlesque comedy of the original I Love Lucy television show, "Mame" is a failure. Time wrote "The movie spans about 20 years, and seems that long in running time ... Miss Ball has been molded over the years into some sort of national monument, and she performs like one too. Her grace, her timing, her vigor have all vanished."  Time Out London declared she "simply hasn't the drive and steel of a Rosalind Russell, an Angela Lansbury, or a Ginger Rogers, all of whom played the part before her," and wrote of Saks: "When he's not ogling his star in perpetual soft focus and a $300,000 fashion parade, [he] fails to get enough retakes, match his shots, or inject the essential vim." Pauline Kael in The New Yorker wondered, "After forty years in movies and TV, did she discover in herself an unfulfilled ambition to be a flaming drag queen?" The New Republic'''s Stanley Kauffmann, though he pointed out that Ball would have made a perfect Mame had she played the role "fifteen years earlier," described her as "too old, too stringy in the legs, too basso in the voice, and too creaky in the joints." Virtually every critic took notice of the heavy-handedness in photographing Ball out of focus, Rex Reed going so far as to suggest, albeit jokingly, that chicken fat was put over the lens. Some regarded this as evidence that those executives responsible for signing Ball, and Ball herself, knew from the outset that she was too old for her role. In her defense in regards to her lack of singing ability, Ball told one interviewer "Mame stayed up all night and drank champagne! What did you expect her to sound like? Julie Andrews?"

In his Movie Guide, critic Leonard Maltin rated the film as "BOMB" and wrote: "Hopelessly out-of-date musical...will embarrass even those who love Lucy. Calling Fred and Ethel Mertz!"

Not all the reviews were bad. Vincent Canby in The New York Times, for example, expressed "great reservations" about the film and Ball's close-ups, but noted that the film is "as determined to please in its way as Mame is in hers" and that the opening credits, "which look like a Cubist collage in motion, are so good they could be a separate subject." Canby went on to praise Ball as well: "When the character of Lucy, an inspired slapstick performer, coincides with that of Auntie Mame, the Big-Town sophisticate, 'Mame' is marvelous. I think of Lucy's turning a Georgia fox hunt into a gigantic shambles, or of her bringing the curtain down on a New Haven first-night when, as a budding actress, she falls off a huge cardboard moon. I even treasure her prying loose the fingers of a sloshed Beatrice Arthur who won't give up her martini glass."  Variety reported in its February 27, 1974 review that Ball was "showcased, coiffed, made-up and ably guided from almost television-like slapstick to character sincerity with loving care." Molly Haskell in The Village Voice was "pro-Ball but anti-'Mame'" and felt that Lucy, "a great comedienne...brings it off and even manages to make palatable the kind of character--relentlessly 'on' and trying desperately to be unforgettable--you'd walk a mile to avoid in real life." In the March 18, 1974 issue of New York magazine, Judith Crist similarly was displeased with the film but supportive of its star: "Lucille Ball is – and no 'still' about it – a first-rate entertainer, supplementing her superb comedic sense with a penetrating warmth and inner humor. She is without peer in making a hung-over stagger from bed to bathroom an exercise in regal poise, in using her slightly crooked smile to vitiate the soppiness of an overly sentimental sequence, in applying her Goldwyn Girl chorine know-how to a dash of song and dance." Milton Krims, the film critic for The Saturday Evening Post, wrote (in the magazine's March 1974 issue) a breathless paean to Lucille Ball and the film, concluding that "Mame is Lucille Ball and Lucille Ball is Mame."

The Hollywood Foreign Press Association awarded Ball a Golden Globe nomination (Arthur received one as well) but, disheartened by its reception, she swore she never would appear on the big screen again, and the film proved to be her last theatrical film (not counting Stone Pillow, her 1985 made-for-TV film).

Beatrice Arthur later called her involvement with the film a "tremendous embarrassment", and expressed regret at having participated. Although she enjoyed working with Lucille Ball, she made no secret of her opinion that Ball was "terribly miscast".

Home mediaMame was released on pan-and-scan VHS and pan-and-scan and letterbox laserdisc editions in the 1980s and 1990s. While these official editions have long since been out-of-print, bootleg DVDs taken from the widescreen laserdisc or widescreen TV broadcasts on American Movie Classics and Turner Classic Movies have been known to exist.

On June 19, 2007, Mame officially was released on DVD both separately and in a special DVD collection of Lucille Ball's films. The DVD includes a remastered version of the film in anamorphic widescreen with Dolby Digital 1.0 mono sound, the original theatrical trailer, and the featurette Lucy Mame.

Although Warner had intended to give the film a 5.1 stereo remastering, it was unable to do so due to several factors. The main factor was the fact that Ball's vocals in her songs often had to be pieced together line by line in order to get a more pitch-perfect performance (this method is a lot more obvious on the soundtrack CD, where one often hears a difference in fidelity in each individual line as well as the occasional line that sounds like two Lucys singing.) This and the varying conditions of the original master copies caused Warner Bros. to simply restore the original release's mono soundtrack and remaster it in Dolby Digital 1.0 mono and use it for the DVD's audio track.

See also
 List of American films of 1974

References

 Desilu: The Story of Lucille Ball and Desi Arnaz by Coyne Steven Sanders and Tom Gilbert, published by William Morrow & Company, 1993, pages 336-340
 Showtune, A Memoir'' by Jerry Herman with Marilyn Stasio, published by Donald I. Fine Books, 1996, pages 209-211

External links
 
 
 
 
 

Mame
1974 films
1970s musical comedy films
American musical comedy films
Films based on musicals
Films based on musicals based on films 
Films based on American novels
Films directed by Gene Saks
Films set in Connecticut
Films set in Georgia (U.S. state)
Films set in New York City
Films set in the 1920s
Films set in the 1930s
Films shot in Los Angeles
Warner Bros. films
1974 comedy films
1974 musical films
Avalanches in film
1970s English-language films
1970s American films